Stylobates is a genus of cnidarians belonging to the family Actiniidae.

The species of this genus are found in Pacific Ocean, near Australia.

Species:

Stylobates aeneus 
Stylobates birtlesi 
Stylobates calcifer 
Stylobates cancrisocia 
Stylobates loisetteae

References

Actiniidae
Hexacorallia genera